Mid-Columbia River National Wildlife Refuge Complex is a group of protected areas in the U.S. states of Oregon and Washington. Headquartered in Burbank, Washington, its administrators manage seven national wildlife refuges (NWR)s and one national monument on or near the Columbia River. They are Cold Springs, Columbia, Conboy Lake, McKay Creek, McNary, Toppenish and Umatilla NWRs and Hanford Reach National Monument.

References

National Wildlife Refuges in Oregon
National Wildlife Refuges in Washington (state)